Carmen Berenguer (born 1946 in Santiago, Chile) is a Chilean poet, audio-visual artist and reporter. Her poetry has been gathered in several anthologies and she has been an editor of various publications: Hoja X Ojo, 1984; y Al Margen, 1986.

Collaborations
 Women's Literature Congress, organizer, Chile, 1987.
 Poetry International Festival with La reconstrucción del tiempo (Time's Reconstruction), organised by Sergio Badilla Castillo and Sun Axelsson, Stockholm, 1989.
Delito y Traición, documentary, National Congress of Chile, 2003.

Awards
Pablo Neruda Award, 2008

Works 
 Bobby Sands desfallece en el muro (1983)
 Huellas de siglo (1986)
 A media asta (1988)
 Sayal de pieles (1993)
 Naciste pintada (1999)
 La gran hablada (2002)
 Chiiit, son las ventajas de la escritura, (2008)
 Mama Marx, (2009)
 Maravillas pulgares, (2009)
 Maravillas pulgares, (2012)
 Venid a verme ahora, (2012)
 Mi Lai, (2015)

References

1946 births
Living people
Chilean women poets
20th-century Chilean poets
21st-century Chilean poets
20th-century Chilean women writers
21st-century Chilean women writers